Killarney Racecourse is a horse racing venue in Killarney, County Kerry, Ireland which stages both National Hunt and Flat racing. Racing at Killarney has been taking place since 1822. The course is a left-handed oval, one mile and two furlongs in circumference.

References

External links
 Official website
 Go Racing Profile
 Go Racing Profile

 
Horse racing venues in the Republic of Ireland
Sports venues in County Kerry
Sports venues completed in 1822
1822 establishments in Ireland